Collin Karl Mooney (born April 3, 1986) is an American football fullback who last played for the Atlanta Falcons of the National Football League (NFL) before being released on February 15, 2016. He played college football for the Army Black Knights of the United States Military Academy. Mooney is West Point's all-time single-season rushing leader with 1,339 yards. In the last play of the 2008 Army-Navy Game, his final college game, he bested Mike Mayweather's record by a single yard. Mooney played for the Tennessee Titans of the National Football League during the 2012 and 2013 seasons.

Early years
Mooney was born in Houston, Texas to Chuck and Kris Mooney. Mooney attended highschool at James E. Taylor where he played on both sides of the ball as a fullback and linebacker. He was a three-year letterwinner in football and earned All-Academic team honors all four years. Mooney also played baseball and belonged to the National Honor Society.

College career

Mooney first played in the 2006 season and saw action in nine games, including a role on special teams. In 2007, Mooney played as a back-up in all 12 games.

In 2008, Mooney ran for a school record 1,339 yards in 12 games. In an overtime loss against Buffalo, Mooney rushed for 172 yards and two touchdowns including an 81-yard touchdown run. For his performance against the Bulls, who went on to beat undefeated Ball State for the MAC championship, Mooney was honored with a "helmet sticker" by ESPN. In a loss at Rice, Mooney picked up 61 yards in a touchdown run. Mooney scored four touchdowns in the 44–13 victory over Tulane. For this, he was bestowed West Point's Black Death Award for "near perfect play", named the Army Athletic Association Athlete of the Week, and nominated for the AT&T All-America Player of the Week honors.

In the last play of his final game for West Point, the 2008 Army-Navy Game, Mooney beat the old school record for single-season rushing by one yard, setting the new record at 1,339 yards. The record was previously held by Mike Mayweather, who still holds the West Point record for career rushing. Army defensive coordinator John Mumford caused some controversy earlier in the season when he stated that "Collin Mooney is probably better than any Navy fullback we've ever faced. Not to compliment Navy, but that's a compliment to Collin."

Mooney played for the East squad in the 2009 East-West Shrine Game. He served three years as an Army officer before being granted a release to play professional football.

Statistics

Professional career
Mooney was signed by the Tennessee Titans on May 1, 2012 after going undrafted in the 2012 NFL Draft.  After seeing modest playing time in the 2012 and 2013 seasons for the team, Mooney was waived by the Tennessee Titans on August 29, 2014.

References

External links

Tennessee Titans bio
Army's Workhorse Has Plowed the Opposition, The Washington Post, December 1, 2008.
Mooney blossoms at Army, The Philadelphia Inquirer, December 3, 2008.
One uniform for another, Houston Chronicle, January 16, 2009.
Gleason: Army FB Mooney is the one who didn't get away, Times Herald-Record, October 16, 2008.
Mooney sets rushing record as Army falls to Navy, The Mountaineer, December 11, 2008.

1986 births
Living people
American football running backs
Army Black Knights football players
People from Katy, Texas
Players of American football from Texas
Sportspeople from Harris County, Texas
Tennessee Titans players
United States Army officers
Military personnel from Texas